Muneeza Hashmi (born 1946) is a broadcaster, television producer, actress and a former general manager of the Pakistan Television Corporation (PTV). Hashmi has over four decades of experience working with public media. She is currently the General Manager International Relations at Hum TV. She is the youngest daughter of the prominent Pakistani poet Faiz Ahmed Faiz.

Education 
She received her early education from Kinnaird College for Women, and her bachelor's from University of the Punjab. She completed her Master's degree in Education from the University of Hawaii, USA in 1981.

Career 
Hashmi started work at the Pakistan Television Corporation (PTV) in 1967 as an assistant producer. In 1998, she level up to the position of the General Manager of Lahore PTV station. She also worked in TV dramas in the 1970s written by Ashfaq Ahmed and she was director programmes at PTV at the time of her retirement from the state-run broadcaster.

Hashmi was twice elected President of the board of the Commonwealth Broadcasting Association. Later, she returned as board president when the CBA rebranded itself as the Public Media Alliance.

She was appointed to hold the inaugural Benazir Bhutto Chair for Peace, Reconciliation and Development at the Lahore College for Women University in 2013.

In August 2019, Hashmi became the chairperson of the board of governors of the Lahore Arts Council. She is the first woman to hold the board chair.

Personal life 
Hashmi was born to Faiz Ahmad Faiz and Alys Faiz in 1946. She has an older sister, Salima Hashmi, who is an acclaimed artist, educator, and activist. She married Humair Hashmi and has two children, the actor Adeel Hashmi and Ali Madeeh Hashmi, a psychiatrist and writer.

Filmography

Television series

Awards and honours 
Hashmi received the Pride of Performance award by the President of Pakistan in 2003 for excellence in art.
She was awarded the Japanese broadcaster NHK's President of NHK Prize for "outstanding achievements in educational media".. "Hashmi was also awarded the NHK Prize for her role in women empowerment and raising human rights awareness".

Bibliography 
Hashmi's collection of interviews of notable Pakistani women, Kaun Hoon Main? (English: Who Am I?), was published in 2014 by the Sustainable Development Policy Institute. In May 2022, she published Conversations with my Father: Forty Years on, a Daughter Responds, a collection of letters her father wrote to her four decades ago.

References

External Links 
 

1946 births
Living people
Pakistani female writers
Pakistani television executives
20th-century Pakistani actresses
Pakistani women
Recipients of the Pride of Performance
Pakistani women writers
21st-century Pakistani actresses
Pakistani broadcasters
Pakistani television actresses
Pakistani people of English descent
Pakistani television producers